Nahne is a district in the south of Osnabrück, Germany with a population of 2,241 residents (as of 31 October 2009), thus making it the city's smallest district in terms of population. It covers an area of 4.854 km2.

Geography 
To the north Nahne borders on the district of Schölerberg, on Kalkhügel to the north-west, Sutthausen to the west and Voxtrup to the east. Georgsmarienhütte’s Harderberg district shares a border with Nahne to the south.

The district's terrain is hilly – it is positioned between the Schölerberg and the Osterberg (127 m and 173 m above sea level respectively. Most of its land area is used for agricultural purposes. The district is divided along a north–south axis by the Iburger Straße (Bundesstraße 51 and Bundesstraße 68) and an east–west axis by Bundesautobahn 30. The main residential areas are located to the north-west and the south-east of this transport axis.

History 
Nahne's history as a farming community goes back roughly 850 years; it used to belong to the parish of St. Johann (St. John) in Osnabrück. Prior to its incorporation into the city on 1 July 1972 it had strong economic links to Osnabrück – due to its largely agrarian character which had helped provide the city with agricultural produce. Until 1934 Nahne had occupied a considerably larger area, stretching all the way up to the district of Fledder in the north. Today the district is characterised by estate houses and large supermarkets; the Osnabrück district's administrative centre (Kreishaus) is located to its east, and a number of medium-sized workshops and other businesses in the west, spread out towards the district's border on Sutthauser Straße. As an independent community Nahne did not have its own crest.

Personalities 
From August to November 1920 the author Erich Maria Remarque worked as a primary school teacher in Nahne.

Nahne is the birthplace of Christian Kleiminger, an SPD politician and representative for Rostock in the Bundestag. He attended the local Franz-Hecker-Grundschule (primary school) from 1972 to 1976.

Places of interest and events 

 St. Ansgar's Kirche (St. Ansgar Church)
 Zoo Osnabruck
 Museum am Schölerberg (natural history museum)
 Planetarium (in the Museum am Schölerberg)
 Grasstrack racing: since the mid-1950s an international motorcycle racing competition has taken place on the grasstrack in Nahne. The event attracts interest from outside the region. It is hosted by the Auto- und Motorsportgemeinschaft Osnabrück (Osnabrück Car and Motor Sports Association).

District assembly 
The Kreishaus of the Osnabrück district is located in Nahne, within the boundaries of the city. The district assembly – the area's highest authority – meets there. Various other administrative bodies of the district are also based in the Kreishaus.

References

External links 
 Quarterly information from the Referat Stadtentwicklung und Bürgerbeteiligung (Department for Urban Development and Citizen Participation), Statistics Department, 4/2008 (PDF file, 1.49 MB, in German)
 City of Osnabrück, Referat für Stadtentwicklung und Bürgerbeteiligung – Statistics Department, 11/2009 (PDF file, 35.4 KB)

Geography of Osnabrück